Realtime Interrupt is a 1995 science fiction novel by James P. Hogan set in a near-future Pittsburgh, Pennsylvania, United States.

It tells the story of Joe Corrigan, who awakens in a Pittsburgh hospital without memory. As director of the supersecret Oz Project, he had worked on a virtual reality software project, and as he slowly recalls his past, he sets out on a quest to pick up the pieces of his past life. He discovers that the virtual reality is still going on.

References

Simulated reality

 Simulated reality
 Simulated reality in fiction

External links
  James P. Hogan website
  James P. Hogan Society website

1995 American novels
Novels set in Pittsburgh